Celestial navigation is the practice of position fixing that allows a navigator to move through space.

Celestial navigation may also refer to:

Celestial Navigation (novel), a 1974 novel by Anne Tyler
"Celestial Navigation", an episode from season 1 of The West Wing

See also
Celestial (disambiguation)